Eugene Omoruyi (born February 14, 1997) is a Nigerian-Canadian professional basketball player for the Detroit Pistons of the National Basketball Association (NBA). He played college basketball for the Rutgers Scarlet Knights and the Oregon Ducks.

Early life and high school career
Omoruyi was born in Benin City, Nigeria and immigrated to Canada with his family as a one-year-old. He grew up playing soccer and began playing basketball during his second year of high school at Monsignor Percy Johnson. Omoruyi attended Orangeville Prep in Orangeville, Ontario, averaging 16.9 points and 9.6 rebounds per game and earning Ontario Scholastic Basketball Association First Team All-Star honors in his final season. He played alongside Jamal Murray and Thon Maker. He competed for Advantage Titans on the Amateur Athletic Union circuit. Omoruyi committed to playing college basketball for Rutgers over an offer from Loyola (Illinois).

College career
As a freshman at Rutgers, Omoruyi averaged 2.4 points and 2.2 rebounds per game. On November 28, 2017, he scored a sophomore season-high 22 points in a 78–73 loss to Florida State. As a sophomore, Omoruyi averaged 7.9 points and five rebounds per game. For his junior season, he was named a team co-captain. During the offseason, he improved his shooting by taking 1,000 shots for six mornings per week. On November 11, 2018, he recorded a junior season-high 24 points and 10 rebounds in a 95–66 win over Drexel. On November 23, Omoruyi posted 20 points and 17 rebounds in a 54–44 win over Boston University. He averaged 13.8 points, 7.2 rebounds and 2.4 assists per game as a junior. He was an All-Big Ten Honorable Mention and Second Team All-Met selection.

For his senior season, Omoruyi transferred to Oregon and sat out for his next season due to National Collegiate Athletic Association transfer rules. His decision to transfer from Rutgers was described by the media as unexpected. On December 2, 2020, he made his debut for Oregon and recorded a career-high 31 points and 11 rebounds in an 83–75 loss to Missouri. As a senior, he averaged 17.1 points, 5.4 rebounds, 2.3 assists and 1.5 steals per game, earning First Team All-Pac-12 honors. Following the season, Omoruyi declared for the 2021 NBA draft.

Professional career

Dallas Mavericks (2021) 
After going undrafted in the 2021 NBA draft, Omoruyi signed a two-way contract with the Dallas Mavericks on August 13, 2021, splitting time with their G League affiliate, the Texas Legends. On December 15, he suffered a season-ending injury while playing with the Legends, and on December 26, he was waived by the Mavericks.

Oklahoma City Thunder (2022–2023) 
On July 2, 2022, Omoruyi signed a two-way contract with the Oklahoma City Thunder. His contract was converted to a multi-year deal on February 10, 2023. On February 26, Omoruyi was waived by the Thunder.

Detroit Pistons (2023–present) 
On March 3, 2023, Omoruyi signed a 10-day contract with the Detroit Pistons. Omoruyi played well enough to earn a 2nd 10-day contract and on March 13 he found himself cracking the starting rotation due to injuries.

Career statistics

NBA

Regular season

|-
| style="text-align:left;"| 
| style="text-align:left;"| Dallas
| 4 || 0 || 4.5 || .400 || .500 || .500 || 1.8 || .5 || .0 || .0 || 1.8
|-
| style="text-align:left;"| 
| style="text-align:left;"| Oklahoma City
| 23 || 2 || 11.8 || .468 || .258 || .607 || 2.3 || .5 || .6 || .0 || 4.9
|- class="sortbottom"
| style="text-align:center;" colspan="2"| Career
| 27 || 2 || 10.7 || .465 || .273 || .594 || 2.2 || .5 || .5 || .0 || 4.4

College

|-
| style="text-align:left;"| 2016–17
| style="text-align:left;"| Rutgers
| 33 || 11 || 12.0 || .349 || .000 || .625 || 2.2 || 1.0 || .5 || .3 || 2.4
|-
| style="text-align:left;"| 2017–18
| style="text-align:left;"| Rutgers
| 32 || 7 || 21.7 || .473 || .000 || .541 || 5.0 || 1.0 || .9 || .8 || 7.9
|-
| style="text-align:left;"| 2018–19
| style="text-align:left;"| Rutgers
| 28 || 26 || 29.2 || .445 || .311 || .714 || 7.2 || 2.4 || .7 || .3 || 13.8
|-
| style="text-align:left;"| 2019–20
| style="text-align:left;"| Oregon
| style="text-align:center;" colspan="11"|  Redshirt
|-
| style="text-align:left;"| 2020–21
| style="text-align:left;"| Oregon
| 28 || 28 || 30.6 || .473 || .376 || .765 || 5.4 || 2.3 || 1.5 || .6 || 17.1
|- class="sortbottom"
| style="text-align:center;" colspan="2"| Career
| 121 || 72 || 22.8 || .453 || .324 || .674 || 4.8 || 1.6 || .9 || .5 || 9.9

References

External links
Oregon Ducks bio
Rutgers Scarlet Knights bio

1997 births
Living people
Basketball people from Ontario
Black Canadian basketball players
Canadian expatriate basketball people in the United States
Canadian men's basketball players
Canadian sportspeople of Nigerian descent
Dallas Mavericks players
Detroit Pistons players
National Basketball Association players from Canada
Nigerian emigrants to Canada
Nigerian men's basketball players
Oklahoma City Thunder players
Oklahoma City Blue players
Oregon Ducks men's basketball players
Rutgers Scarlet Knights men's basketball players
Small forwards
Sportspeople from Benin City
Texas Legends players
Undrafted National Basketball Association players